Jameson Thomas (born Thomas Roland Jameson; 24 March 1888 – 10 January 1939) was an English film actor. He appeared in more than 80 films between 1923 and 1939.

He was born in St George Hanover Square, London. On the stage from his early teens, Jameson first appeared as a "half-breed" boy in The Squaw Man. He made his screen debut in 1923 in the film Chu Chin Chow. In 1929, he starred in Piccadilly as Valentine Wilmot opposite Anna May Wong. Piccadilly was a smash hit in England, where reviewers called it "by far the best production yet made at Elstree" and "one of the finest films that has ever come from a British studio." The film, however, only received a tepid response in the U.S. where it had a limited run. Today, Piccadilly is recognised as an accomplished melodrama and one of the best films of the late British silent era.

Thomas moved to Hollywood, appearing on the stage with Bebe Daniels in The Last of Mrs. Cheyney. He continued to appear in minor roles in various films until his death. Thomas played "King" Westley, the fortune-hunting husband/fiancé of Claudette Colbert in Frank Capra's comedy It Happened One Night. He died from tuberculosis in Sierra Madre, California. He was interred at the Hollywood Forever Cemetery in Hollywood.

Filmography

 Chu-Chin-Chow (1923) - Omar
 Decameron Nights (1924) - Imliff
 The Sins Ye Do (1924) - Captain Barrington
 Afraid of Love (1925) - Philip Bryce
 A Daughter of Love (1925) - Dr. Eden Brent
 The Apache (1925) - Gaston d'Harcourt
 The Gold Cure (1925) - Lansing Carter
 The Hound of the Deep (1926) - 'Black' Darley
 Jungle Woman (1926) - 'Black' Darley
 Blighty (1927) - David Marshall
 The Antidote (1927, Short) - Prof. Gilbert Olives
 Roses of Picardy (1927) - Georges d'Archeville
 Poppies of Flanders (1927) - Jim Brown
 The White Sheik (1928) - Westwyn
 The Farmer's Wife (1928) - Farmer Sweetland
 Tesha (1928) - Robert Dobree
 The Apache (1928) - Minor Role (uncredited)
 The Rising Generation (1928) - Major Kent
 Piccadilly (1929) - Valentine Wilmot
 High Treason (1929) - Michael Deane
 Week-End Wives (1929) - Henri Monard
 Power Over Men (1929) - Philippe Garnier
 The Love of the Brothers Rott (1929) - Robert
 The Feather (1929) - Roger Dalton
 The Hate Ship (1929) - Vernon Wolfe
 Elstree Calling (1930, cameo appearance) - Himself
 Extravagance (1930) - Harrison Morrell
 Night Birds (1930) - Deacon Lake
 Lover Come Back (1931) - Yates
 Chances (1931) - Lt. Taylor (uncredited)
 Night Life in Reno (1931) - John Wyatt
 Convicted (1931) - Bruce Allan
 The Devil Plays (1931) - Harry Forrest
 Three Wise Girls (1932) - Arthur Phelps
 Escapade (1932) - John Whitney
 The Trial of Vivienne Ware (1932) - Damon Fenwick
 The Phantom President (1932) - Jerrido
 No More Orchids (1932) - Prince Carlos
 Self Defense (1932) - Jeff Bowman
 The Secret of Madame Blanche (1933) - Jones - a Private Detective (uncredited)
 Brief Moment (1933) - Count Armand
 The Solitaire Man (1933) - Inspector Kenyon (uncredited)
 The Invisible Man (1933) - Hospital Doctor (uncredited)
 Bombay Mail (1934) - Capt. Gerald Worthing
 A Woman's Man (1934) - Roger Pentley - Playboy
 Beggars in Ermine (1934) - James 'Jim' Marley
 It Happened One Night (1934) - "King" Westley
 Stolen Sweets (1934) - Barrington Thorne
 The Scarlet Empress (1934) - Lt. Ovitsyn (uncredited)
 Call It Luck (1934) - Colonel Sir Ridley Quigley (uncredited)
 Jane Eyre (1934) - Charles Craig
 The Moonstone (1934) - Godfrey Ablewhite
 A Lost Lady (1934) - Lord Verrington
 The Curtain Falls (1934) - Martin Deveridge
 Happiness Ahead (1934) - Bradford Servant in Kitchen (uncredited)
 Crimson Romance (1934) - English Officer
 A Successful Failure (1934) - Jerry Franklin, Ruth's Beau
 The World Accuses (1934) - Jerome Rogers
 Sing Sing Nights (1934) - Robert McCaigh
 The Man Who Reclaimed His Head (1934) - Board Director (uncredited)
 The Lives of a Bengal Lancer (1935) - Hendrickson
 Rumba (1935) - Jack Solanger
 Mister Dynamite (1935) - Carey Williams
 Charlie Chan in Egypt (1935) - Dr. Anton Racine
 The Last Outpost (1935) - Cullen
 The Lady in Scarlet (1935) - Dr. Phillip J. Boyer
 Coronado (1935) - Carlton
 Mr. Deeds Goes to Town (1936) - Mr. Semple (uncredited)
 Lady Luck (1936) - Jack Conroy
 House of Secrets (1936) - Coventry
 Girl Loves Boy (1937) - Lawyer Mack
 The League of Frightened Men (1937) - Michael Ayers
 Parnell (1937) - Judge Nanan (uncredited)
 Souls at Sea (1937) - Pelton (uncredited)
 The Man Who Cried Wolf (1937) - George Bradley
 One Hundred Men and a Girl (1937) - Russell
 Death Goes North (1939) - Robert Druid, alias Herbert Barlow

References

External links

1888 births
1939 deaths
20th-century English male actors
20th-century deaths from tuberculosis
English male film actors
English male stage actors
English male silent film actors
Male actors from London
Tuberculosis deaths in California